Tychiini is a tribe of leguminous seed weevils in the family of beetles known as Curculionidae. There are about 5 genera and at least 30 described species in Tychiini.

Genera
These five genera belong to the tribe Tychiini:
 Lignyodes Dejean, 1835 i c g b (ash seed weevils)
 Ochyromera Pascoe, 1874 i c g b
 Plocetes LeConte, 1876 i c g b
 Sibinia Germar, 1817 i c g b
 Tychius Germar, 1817 i c g b
Data sources: i = ITIS, c = Catalogue of Life, g = GBIF, b = Bugguide.net

References

Further reading

External links

 

Curculioninae